Lasa or LASA may refer to:

Places 
 Lassa, Lebanon, a village in the Byblos District
 Lasa, Paphos, a village in Paphos District, Cyprus
 Lasa, the Italian name for Laas, a municipality in South Tyrol, Italy
 Lhasa, the capital of Tibet Autonomous Region of People's Republic of China

Other uses
 Laboratory Animal Science Association, a member of the Federation of European Laboratory Animal Science Associations
 Lares or Lasas, gods and goddesses in Etruscan mythology
 Latin American Studies Association
 Liberal Arts and Science Academy in Austin, Texas, a magnet high school

People with the name
 Bernardo Estornés Lasa (1907–1999), writer and promoter of Basque culture
 Mikel Lasa (born 1971), Spanish football player
  or Lasa III (born 1972), Spanish player of Basque pelota
 Tassilo von Heydebrand und der Lasa, German chess master

See also 
 Lhasa (disambiguation)
 Lahsa (disambiguation)
 Lassa (disambiguation)